Celtic Woman: A Celtic Family Christmas is a collaborative album by the group Celtic Woman and The High Kings, released on October 14, 2008.

Performers in A Celtic Family Christmas are vocalists Chloë Agnew, Lisa Kelly, Órla Fallon, Méav Ní Mhaolchatha, and fiddler Máiréad Nesbitt. It is the second Christmas-themed album to be released by the group, with all newly recorded songs. This album's version of "Carol of the Bells" features the main vocalists, unlike the original release in Celtic Woman: A Christmas Celebration, where only Máiréad Nesbitt performed. The DVD release of A Christmas Celebration shows the only recorded performances of the songs in this album, except for the last three tracks.

Track listing

Charts

References

Celtic Woman albums
2008 albums
Manhattan Records albums